Welcome to the Wrecking Ball! is Grace Slick's 1981 follow-up to her solo album Dreams (1980).  Her third solo album, it was released before stepping back into her old position in Jefferson Starship. The lyrics of the first track include numerous references to Slick's dislike of rock journalists and critics. The album rose to #48 on the Billboard charts.

Track listing
All songs written by Scott Zito except where noted

Singles
"Sea of Love" (1981)
"Mistreater" (1981)

Personnel
Grace Slick – vocals
Scott Zito – lead guitar, vocals, harmonica
Danny Gulino – rhythm guitar
Phil Stone – bass
Bobby Torello – drums
Paul Harris – keyboards
Joe Lala – percussion

Production
Ron Frangipane – producer, arrangements
Ed Sprigg – engineer
Scott Zito – arrangements
Skip Johnson – management, cover concept
Michael Guerra, Alan Meyerson, Kevin Ryan – assistant engineers
Jim Mesham – equipment manager
Recorded at Criteria Recording Studios, Miami and The Hit Factory, New York City
Mastered at Masterdisk, NYC, by Bob Ludwig
Grace Slick – cover concept
Roger Ressmeyer – photo
"Bijou" – make-up
Joe Stelmach – art director
Tony King – creative director

References

External links

Grace Slick albums
1981 albums
RCA Records albums